The following is a list of ecoregions in Mexico as identified by the World Wide Fund for Nature (WWF). A different system of ecoregional analysis is used by the Commission for Environmental Cooperation, a trilateral body linking Mexican, Canadian and United States environmental regime.

Terrestrial ecoregions
The terrestrial ecoregions of Mexico span two biogeographic realms - the Nearctic and Neotropic - which together constitute the entire biogeography of the Americas.

Veracruz is the most biodiverse state with 10 ecoregions across 5 biomes and 2 realms. Chiapas comes in a close second with 10 ecoregions across 4 biomes in the same realm. By contrast, Morelos is the least biodiverse state with just 2 ecoregions.

Freshwater ecoregions

Baja California Complex

 Baja California

Colorado River Complex

 Colorado Delta
 Sonoran

Sinaloan Coastal Complex

 Sinaloan Coastal

Rio Bravo Complex

 Rio Bravo
 Pecos
 Guzman
 Mapimí
 Cuatro Ciénegas
 Llanos El Salado
 Conchos
 Lower Rio Bravo
 Rio San Juan
 Rio Salado

Lerma/Santiago Complex

 Santiago
 Chapala
 Lerma
 Rio Verde Headwaters
 Manantlan/Ameca

Rio Panuco Complex

 Rio Panuco

Balsas Complex

 Balsas

Pacific Central Complex

 Tehuantepec

Atlantic Central Complex

 Southern Veracruz
 Belizean Lowlands
 Catemaco
 Coatzacoalcos
 Grijalva-Usumacinta
 Yucatán

Marine ecoregions

Warm Temperate Northeast Pacific
 Southern California Bight 
 Cortezian
 Magdalena Transition

Tropical East Pacific
 Revillagigedos
 Mexican Tropical Pacific
 [Clipperton] (an overseas possession of France, disputed by Mexico)
 Chiapas-Nicaragua

Warm Temperate Northwest Atlantic
 Northern Gulf of Mexico

Tropical Northwestern Atlantic
 Southern Gulf of Mexico
 Western Caribbean

See also
List of ecoregions in the United States (WWF)
List of ecoregions in Guatemala
List of ecoregions in Belize

References

 Olson, D., Dinerstein, E., Canevari, P., Davidson, I., Castro, G., Morisset, V., Abell, R., and Toledo, E.; eds. (1998). Freshwater biodiversity of Latin America and the Caribbean: A conservation assessment. Biodiversity Support Program, Washington DC.
 Ricketts, Taylor H; Eric Dinerstein; David M. Olson; Colby J. Loucks; et al. (1999). Terrestrial Ecoregions of North America: a Conservation Assessment. Island Press; Washington, DC.

 
Mexico
Ecoregions